Charles Andrew O'Connor, (31 December 1854 – 18 October 1928) was an Irish judge who served as a Judge of the Supreme Court from 1924 to 1925. His judgment in a  case of R. (Egan) v. Macready is still influential.

Background and education

Born on 31 December 1854, he was the third son of Charles Andrew O'Connor, solicitor, of Roscommon. His mother Catherine was the daughter of C. G. Smyth. O'Connor was educated at St Stanislaus College and went then to Trinity College Dublin, graduating with a Bachelor of Arts in 1876, and in 1877 was elected Auditor of the College Historical Society. In 1876, he was admitted to the Middle Temple and two years later he was called to the Irish Bar. In 1890, he obtained his Master of Arts.

Judicial career

O'Connor was appointed a Queen's Counsel in 1894 and was chosen a bencher after two years. He was appointed First Serjeant in 1907 and became Solicitor-General for Ireland two years later. In 1911, he took over as Attorney-General for Ireland, on which occasion he was sworn of the Privy Council of Ireland. In the following year, he succeeded as Master of the Rolls in Ireland, which he held until the establishment of the Irish Free State in 1922. O'Connor retained the position in the new state for the next two years until its abolition in 1924. Subsequently, he received an appointment as a judge of the Supreme Court of the Irish Free State, retiring after one year in 1925. He was one of only two judges of the old regime who were thought worth retaining by the new Irish Government, which acted on the advice of Hugh Kennedy, the first Chief Justice of Ireland, who believed that O'Connor had demonstrated his integrity and independence of mind in the Egan case (below).

Notable judgments

Although his training had been in Chancery, O'Connor is best remembered for two notable judgments in the field of habeas corpus, both a product of the political turmoil of the period 1919–1923. In R. (Egan) v. Macready he found that the power to declare martial law imposed by the Restoration of Order in Ireland Act 1920 did not confer a power to impose the death penalty, and ordered the release of the applicant Egan, who was under sentence of death. When Nevil Macready, the Commander in Chief refused to comply, O'Connor caused a sensation by ordering his attachment for contempt of court. Egan was then released. The judgment was extremely influential, although one crucial finding that there is no limit to the number of habeas corpus applications which can be made by a single applicant has been much debated, and in Ireland itself was modified by the Second Amendment of the Constitution of Ireland.

His judgment in Application of Childers is a striking contrast. Erskine Childers, one of the leaders of the Anti-Treaty side during the Irish Civil War, was captured by Government forces, court-martialled and sentenced to death in November 1922. O'Connor refused to interfere, finding that the formative Irish Free State, unlike General Macready, did have power to establish military courts that could impose the death penalty. He summed up:

While O'Connor was universally regarded as a man of integrity, who would never consciously bend the law, it is possible that his attitude had hardened since Egan; certainly it cannot have helped Childers that his allies had destroyed the Four Courts, a fact to which O'Connor drew attention in stressing the magnitude of the problems which the new Government faced. Childers appealed, but before this could be heard, he was executed three days later.

Family

In 1890, O'Connor married Blanche, the daughter of James Scully. He died in 1928.

Character

Maurice Healy praised O'Connor as "the greatest gentleman at the Irish Bar" and an extremely popular judge, even if he did not fully live up to expectations. O'Connor was modest about his own abilities, noting in Egan that if he differed from colleagues with more experience of criminal law, it was not because he thought himself in any way superior to them. His main personal foible is said by Healy to have been his pride in belonging to the Clan O'Connor and a tendency to bore listeners with its history.

Notes

References

External links
 

1854 births
1928 deaths
Alumni of Trinity College Dublin
Attorneys-General for Ireland
Irish Queen's Counsel
Members of the Middle Temple
Members of the Privy Council of the United Kingdom
Solicitors-General for Ireland
Judges of the Supreme Court of Ireland
Members of the Privy Council of Ireland
People from County Roscommon
Masters of the Rolls in Ireland
Serjeants-at-law (Ireland)